The Great Battle is a 2018 South Korean historical epic action film directed by Kim Kwang-sik. It stars Jo In-sung, Nam Joo-hyuk, and Park Sung-woong. The film was released in South Korea on September 19, 2018.

Premise
A historical film about the siege of Ansi Fortress and the epic eighty-eight day battle that Yang Manchun and his Goguryeo troops fought against 500,000 invading Tang dynasty men to defend it.

Cast

Main
Jo In-sung as Yang Manchun
Nam Joo-hyuk as Sa-mul
Park Sung-woong as Li Shimin

Supporting

Bae Sung-woo as Choo Soo-ji
Uhm Tae-goo as Pa-so
Kim Seol-hyun as Baek-ha
Oh Dae-hwan as Hwal-bo
Park Byung-eun as Poong
Jung Eun-chae as Si-mi
Yu Oh-seong as Yeon Gaesomun 
Sung Dong-il as Woo-dae
Jang Gwang
Yeo Hoe-hyun as Ma-ro

Special appearance
Stephanie Lee as Dal-rae

Production 
Filming began on August 23, 2017 and finished January 24, 2018.

The filming set featured a replica of the Ansi Fortress which was built 11 meters (36 feet) high and 180 meters (590 feet) in length.

Release 
The film premiered in South Korea on September 19, 2018, with age 12-rating. The film was released alongside Fengshui, The Negotiation, and The Nun, considered the most competitive week on Korean Box Office this year.

The film was released in North America on September 21, 2018. As of September 21, the film had been sold to over 32 countries, with release date in United Kingdom, Vietnam, Australia, New Zealand, Taiwan, and Singapore set in October 2018.

It was released on V.O.D on October 24, 2018.

Reception

Critical response 
The film received mostly positive reviews from critics. Praise was given to its cinematography, Kim's directing, the action sequences and acting performances. However, there were criticisms regarding the portrayal of Yang Man-chun and the historical accuracy of the film.

Yoon Min-sik from The Korea Herald wrote, "Director Kim did a clever job of masking his actors' weak points and making the most of their strengths in this action-packed flick. Jo's voice still seems out of place in a period piece, but his character refrains from making any more big speeches, taking action instead. It is very unlikely that Yang Man-chun was in his mid-30s, or that there was a squad of beautiful women shooting blowguns, or a group of borderline super-soldiers fighting without their helmets, but this movie throws historical accuracy out the window and the result is a lot of fun."

Shim Sun-ah from Yonhap News Agency wrote, "Visually striking, imaginative and compelling, The Great Battle easily claims its status as one of the most impressive war epics to have come out of Korean cinema in a long time. Since little is known about the battle and Yang Man-chun, making a tentpole based on long-forgotten ancient history with a relatively untested director was a massive gamble and could have gone horribly wrong. However, he combined his energetic style with  spectacular slow-motion sequences depicting every detail of the battle's ferocious brutality and the fear of the outnumbered Goguryo soldiers as they see the swarming Tang invaders."

Cary Darling from the Houston Chronicle wrote, "Director Kim Kwang-shik has a surprisingly keen eye for wide-screen, CGI-embellished action choreography that is often wildly impressive... The Great Battle rings with the echoes of such sweeping, cinematic blitzkriegs as the Battle of Helm's Deep in Peter Jackson's The Lord of the Rings: The Two Towers or any number of Game of Thrones assaults."

Richard Yu from Cinema Escapist wrote, "while The Great Battle excels at action-packed scenes and a fast-moving storyline, the screenwriting falls short. A mysterious oracle who happens to be Yang's former love interest makes an appearance, but adds little to the story before she is quickly killed off. And much to our dismay, Baek-ha never gets to fully develop her relationship with her dashing cavalry officer before he dies in combat. While this may be due to the limited running time of 136 minutes, director Kim Kwang-sik could have taken a page from John Woo's Red Cliff and split the film into two parts to give the ensemble cast ample time to develop their characters."

Box office
The film grossed  from previews and pre-sales.

On its opening day, the film finished first place at the box office by attracting 122,699 moviegoers with  gross. After four days of strong performance, the film surpassed 1 million admissions on September 23. During its opening weekend, the film topped box office with  gross from 1,128,374 attendance, leaving Fengshui and The Negotiation in second and third place respectively.

On September 24, 6 days after its release, the film surpassed 2 million admissions, sooner than 2012 Chuseok's hit Masquerade which surpassed the milestone in 8 days. The film surpassed 3 million admissions two days later. On September 29, the film surpassed 4 million admissions after topping the box office for 10 days.

The film surpassed 5 million admissions on October 6, 2018. During its third weekend, the film earned  gross from 234,886 attendance, 72% lower gross compared to its second weekend. The film finished third, tailing Venom and Dark Figure of Crime. The film finished in fifth place during its fourth weekend, having a 70% drop in gross compared to the previous weekend.

On October 22, the film surpassed its break-even point at 5.4 million admissions. The film attracted 5,441,020 moviegoers with  gross.

Awards and nominations

References

External links
 
 
 The Great Battle at Naver

South Korean action war films
South Korean historical action films
2010s historical action films
2010s action war films
2018 films
2010s Korean-language films
2010s Mandarin-language films
Next Entertainment World films
Films set in Goguryeo
War adventure films
2010s South Korean films